Veliko Brdo is a village in Dalmatia region of Croatia. The settlement is administered as a part of the Town of Makarska and Split-Dalmatia County. According to the 2011 census, the village has 408 inhabitants.

Sources

Populated places in Split-Dalmatia County